Planotortrix puffini is a species of moth of the family Tortricidae. It is endemic to New Zealand.  Specimens have been collected from Lee Bay in Stewart Island.

The wingspan is 24–30 mm for males and 26–40 mm for females.

The larvae feed on Brachyglottis reinoldii, Celmisia lindsayi, Olearia colensoi (subspecies colensoi and grandis) and Olearia oporina. They have a grey or grey-green body and a brown head.

Etymology
The species name is derived from the Latin name Puffinus, the genus to which the muttonbird belongs, this refers to the larval association with so-called muttonbird scrubs.

References

Moths described in 1990
Archipini
Moths of New Zealand
Endemic fauna of New Zealand
Endemic moths of New Zealand